Walter Braemer (7 January 1883  13 June 1955) was a general in the Reichswehr and the Wehrmacht and a high-ranking SS commander during the Nazi era. He was a Nazi criminal responsible for mass murders of the civilian population of Bromberg/Bydgoszcz in Poland at the outset of the Second World War, and later for crimes against humanity in the Hol­o­caust in the Soviet Union. He escaped prosecution and punishment after the war despite having been held for  years as a prisoner of war by the British.

Early career 
Braemer was born at Königsberg, then an East Prussian port city on the Baltic Sea, on 7 January 1883. His military career under the German Empire and the Weimar Republic bears the unmistakable hallmarks of patronage commonly accorded at the time to people of high birth.

On 2 March 1901, at the age of 18, he enlisted as a Fähnrich (officer candidate or ensign) in the 2nd Hanoverian Dragoon Regiment No. 16 (2. Hannoversches Dragoner-Regiment Nr. 16), a unit of the 20th Division of the Prussian Army stationed in the northern garrison town of Lüneburg in the Prussian Province of Hanover. Less than eleven months later, on 27 January 1902, he was promoted, without much education, military or other­wise, to the commissioned rank of  Leutnant     his commission as an officer (the so-called Offiziers­patent) having been issued on 22 June 1900, that is, actually prior to his enlistment in the army, at a time when he was a civilian minor of 17 years of age.

Only subsequently, for two years between 1906 and 1908, did he study at the Military School of Equitation (Militär­reit­schule  see Militär­reit­in­s­ti­tut) in Hanover. This course was followed by 2 years 9 months and 3 weeks he spent at a military academy (sources speak of a Kriegs­aka­de­mie: unclear whether the Prussian War Academy is meant, three other options being possible) where he was enrolled until 21 July 1911.

In April 1912, was detached to the central military command known as the "Great General Staff", the governing body of the army. While there, he was given the higher rank of Rittmeister ("captain of the cavalry") on 17 February 1914, and five days later formally inducted into the Great General Staff at the age of 31.

When the First World War broke out, Braemer was transferred on 2 August 1914 to the headquarters of the 9th Cavalry Division, a formation newly raised specifically for the war effort, where he served as a third-in-command  (Zweiter Ge­ne­ral­stabs­of­fi­zier or so-called "Ib") under the fellow-Prussian commander Eberhard Graf von Schmettow and the latter's right hand or "Ia" (Erster Ge­ne­ral­stabs­of­fi­zier or second-in-command), Major Herwarth von Bittenfeld.

Braemer married Erika Freiin von der Goltz on 27 December 1915; they had three children (b. 1916, 1921, and 1923). Between 9 September 1916 and 18 April 1917 he circulated between the General Staffs (divisional commands) of such formations as the 75th Reserve Division, and the 6th and 7th Cavalry Divisions, before being appointed to the General Staff of the XII (1st Royal Saxon) Corps at Dresden. On 17 January 1917 he was decorated with the Royal Prussian Hohenzollern House Order (Knight's Cross with Swords) for military exploits that remain a complete mystery. He then served for a few months between November 1917 and March 1918 under the Ober­quartier­meister (quartermaster-general) within the command known as the 10th Army in Cologne, before being posted very briefly on 28 March 1918 to the General Staff of the 234th Infantry Division (234. Division (Deutsches Kaiserreich)), and the next month again to that of the XXVI Reserve Corps.

After the War he served in the 20th Reichswehr Brigade based at Allenstein (now Olsztyn) in Ermland, 126 km south of his native Königsberg in East Prussia (1 May 1919­13 De­cem­ber 1919), before being delegated to a desk job at the Bendlerblock in Berlin  the Ministry of the Reichswehr  for a period of 2 years and  months between 13 December 1919 and 1 April 1922. While there he was again promoted to the rank of Major (roughly equivalent to major in Anglo-American taxonomies) on 1 January 1922. For 18 months between April 1922 to October 1923 he was squadron leader (Es­ka­d­ron­chef) in the 2nd (Prus­sian) Cavalry Regiment (2. (Preußisches) Rei­ter-Re­gi­ment (Reichs­wehr)) that garrisoned both Allenstein and Osterode (now Ostróda) in Ermland, then within the Province of East Prussia. Next, over the period of 3 years and 4 months from October 1923 to Feb­ru­a­ry 1927, Braemer served on the General Staff of the 6th Division at Münster in Westphalia: here he saw another ad­vance­ment in rank to Oberst­leutnant (lieu­ten­ant colonel) on 1 April 1926. From 1 February 1927 to 1 Jan­u­a­ry 1931 he held the command of the 6th (Prussian) Cavalry Regiment (6. (Preu­ßi­sches) Rei­ter-Re­gi­ment) headquartered in the northern town of Pasewalk, about 40 km west of Stettin (now Szczecin) in Western Pomerania  a post in which he spent 3 years and 11 months (his longest tour of duty ever). A promotion to the rank of Oberst (or colonel) was accorded him there on 1 October 1929. Lastly, Braemer held the military command of the city of Inster­burg in East Prussia (now Chernyakhovsk in Russia), some 100 km east of his native Königsberg, during the nearly 22-month period from 1 January 1931 to 30 November 1932. Here he was elevated to the General­major­ship (a rank roughly corresponding to that of brigadier general) on 1 October 1932, and two months later retired from the Reichswehr at the age of 49.

Nazi period

The beginning 
Two years and eight months after Hitler's rise to power and nearly three years after his leave-taking of the army, on 1 October 1935, Braemer  then aged 52  joined the SS with the rank of Standartenführer (regiment leader), and in this rank was posted as a "training consultant" to the General Staff of the SS circuit or Ober­abschnitt known as command Nord (not an army post), where he stayed until 15 April 1936, to be transferred to the Ober­abschnitt Nord­west for one month, before being moved again to the Ober­abschnitt Nord­see, where he stay­ed until 1 July 1938. All three SS districts in question were at the time head­quar­ter­ed at Altona in Hamburg. In the course of his SS service Braemer gained two promotions, ultimately to Bri­ga­de­füh­rer, the fourth-highest rank in the SS, a remarkably quick climb accomplished in less than 2 years and 9 months since joining the ranks. The latter rank of Bri­ga­de­füh­rer was conferred on him only after he had be­come member of the Nazi party sometime in 1937 (the exact date of his joining the NSDAP has not been established) with the membership number 4012329. At this time Braemer involved himself with Himmler's Lebens­born So­ci­e­ty, an or­gan­i­za­tion whose purpose was to devise ways and means of en­gi­neer­ing the genetic makeup of the German nation by promoting Nazi eugenics and "breeding" pure "Aryans".
On 1 July 1938 Braemer was appointed to the rank of Generalmajor of the Wehrmacht, the same rank he last held in the Reichswehr, and was placed by the SS once again at the disposal of the army. At the time of mobilization mounted in preparation for the Nazi attack on Poland Braemer was appointed the commander of the 580th Rear Army Area (Rück­wärtiges Armee­gebiet 580), a po­si­tion codenamed "Korück 580"  korück being an acronym formed from the words Kommandant (com­mand­er) and rückwärtig (rear), short for Kommandant des rück­wärtigen Armee­gebietes 580. He received that command on 26 August 1939, six days before the invasion of Poland.
Four days after becoming Korück 580, on 30 August 1939, Braemer gave the order for the formation of the concentration camp at Liepe, 8 kilometres west of the current German-Polish border, which camp was es­tab­lish­ed on 1 September 1939, the first day of the Second World War. As Korück 580 Braemer was also responsible for the creation of the camps located at Łopienek (Ruhental) and other localities.

Criminal activities

Poland 

Shortly after the strike on Poland Braemer found himself with the Nazi invasion force in the Polish region of Cuyavia, where according to latest scholarship he was appointed by the 4th German Army  in his capacity as Ko­rück 580  the commandant of the northern Polish city of Bydgoszcz, a position in which he formally styled himself in his written proc­la­ma­tions as the "chief in executive authority" (Inhaber der voll­zie­henden Gewalt in Brom­berg). His short stint as the supremo of Bydgoszcz lasted with effect from 5 Sep­tem­ber 1939  some earlier published sources cite the date of 8 Sep­tem­ber 1939 for his assumption of this post. The dates are significant, as his appearance on the Bydgoszcz stage is said in some sources to have lasted for a total of only six days (although the far limit of his "tour of duty" is in fact uncertain). Within just four days of Braemer's beginning to exercise his "executive authority" he be­came personally re­spon­si­ble for the murder of 370 Polish civilians in Bydgoszcz in the large-scale pacification operations he ordered (the so-called säu­be­rungs­ak­ti­on­en or "cleanup op­e­ra­tions"). These included the public execution by a firing squad in the city's historic Old Market Square (the Stary Rynek) on 9 September 1939 of a large group of civilians ran­dom­ly round­ed up in the streets a short while earlier in the day (see the historical photographs to the right), a crime which provoked in the ensuing months a protest from the Vatican (as the victims included Catholic priests: see Piotr Szarek). By 8 September 1939 the total number of civilian victims of Bydgoszcz executions grew to 200400 by various es­ti­mates; on 9 Sep­tem­ber 1939 another 120 were shot. The next day, 10 September 1939, in a Braemer-ordered raid on the working­-class Byd­goszcz neigh­bour­hood of "Swedish Heights" (Szwederowo) between 120 and 200 ci­vil­ians were killed,­­­ while another public execution staged on that day in the centrally located Old Market Square claimed 20 victims. It is said that the mass murders of civilians in Bydgoszcz went on at such a pace that Braemer, although a "com­pe­tent commandant", eventually lost all count of how many had been killed  and he allowed the slaughter to con­tin­ue. Apparently the level of atrocities was such that on occasion it produced qualms of conscience in his own executioners, but never in Braemer himself (as evidenced by his entries in the personal diary he kept). While carrying out his actions against the townsfolk of Bydgoszcz, in reprisal for the stiff resistance that the civilian population put up against the German invaders after the Polish armed forces withdrew from the city on 4 September 1939, Braemer instituted at the same time ethnic-cleansing policies against the Jewish minority of the town (which numbered about 2,000 before the War), being able as a result to report on 14 November 1939, in the 11th week of the war, that "the Jewish question does not arise in Bydgoszcz... because during the säu­be­rungs­ak­ti­on­en all the Jews who did not deem it advisable to flee from the city beforehand were eliminated". The Bydgoszcz massacres are the primary reason for which some German his­to­ri­ans have con­sid­er­ed Braemer an "extremist" among the Nazi Wehrmacht's corps of generals. Others have described him as a "fanatical Nazi" who resorted to (by then, i.e. in September 1939) "unheard-of brutality".
Little is known of Braemer's activities immediately following his disappearance from the Bydgoszcz scene, a community on which he left an indelible mark, and there is no clear record of his departure as such. Historians (such as Stani­sław Na­wro­cki) have merely noted that he did not play any role in the occupation of the historical region of Greater Poland (Wielko­pol­ska), i.e. of the lands to the west of Cuyavia where Bydgoszcz is located, thereby suggesting that his activities were of interest to researchers in other areas. It is on record, how­ever, that Braemer continued as Ko­rück 580 (a position which put him in charge of "law and order" in areas under Nazi occupation) for a total of nearly 21 months  until 19 May 1941.

After his appointment as Ko­rück 580 came to an end on 19 May 1941, Braemer spent 35 days, until 24 June 1941, officially mothballed in the füh­rer­re­ser­ve or officers' reserve pool within the German Army High Command (Oberkommando des Heeres) as his new assignment was being prepared for him.

The Baltic and Byelorussia 

Two days after the commencement of the Operation Barbarossa (the German attack on the Soviet Union), Braemer was appointed the Wehr­macht­befehls­haber or supreme military commander of the so­-call­ed Reichskommissariat Ostland, a Nazi régime established in the combined occupied territory of the Baltic states, parts of north­eastern Poland and western Byelo­Russia, head­quarter­ed in Riga, the capital of Latvia (again in the general region of his birth, 380 km to the north­-east of his native Königs­berg). He was to hold this office during the period of about 2 years and 10 months between 24 June 1941 and 20 April 1944. In some reports his ap­point­ment to this post was already finalized in the planning stages on 27 May 1941. In this ca­pac­i­ty Braemer was heavily im­pli­cated in the mass murder of the Jew­ish population in the territories under his command. He was responsible for, among other things, prom­ul­gat­ing legislation that laid the legal and operational ground­work on the basis of which whole Jewish communities numbering thousands of people were ex­ter­mi­nated in the Holocaust. Thus for example, on 25 Sep­tem­ber 1941 Braemer issued his "Guidelines for Military Security and Maintenance of Quiet and Order" which specifically stipulated the "imperative elim­i­na­tion" of, among others, "Jews and philo­se­mit­ic elements (ju­den­freund­liche Kreise)". The pivotal role that Braemer played in the Holo­caust of the Jewish populations in Bye­lo­rus­sia has been described by the German historian Hannes Heer. Braemer has been shown to possess the notorious distinction of having originated the first annihilation op­e­ra­tions against the Jewish ghettos in Bye­lo­Russia: the Smilavičy ghetto, whose 1,338 inhabitants were mur­der­ed on 14 October 1941; the Koidanovo ghetto, with its 1,000 victims on 21 October 1941; fol­low­ed by the murder of 5,900 people in the predominantly Jewish town of Slutsk on 27 and 28 October 1941 in a massacre some­times eu­phe­mis­tic­al­ly referred to as the "Slutsk Affair"  and that just to begin with. Braemer's service in the Ostland was considered so meritorious by both the Wehrmacht and the SS that he was rewarded with two military promotions, viz., to Ge­ne­ral­leut­nant (a rank roughly cor­res­pon­ding to major-general) on 1 July 1941, just a week after arrival, and later, 14 months into his tour of duty, on 1 September 1942, as a reward for a job well done, to Ge­ne­ral der Ka­val­le­rie z.v. ("general of the cavalry", the sec­ond­-highest general officer rank roughly equivalent to lieutenant general, a "prestigious" cachet within the echelons of the German military); and then again on the last day of his assignment with an SS pro­mo­tion to the rank of Grup­pen­füh­rer, the third-highest SS rank overall. Goebbels went so far as to discuss Braemer's "po­lit­i­cal ideas" in his diaries (entry for 24 No­vem­ber 1941).

Conflict with Lohse 
Nazi approval of Braemer was not universal, however. During his tenure as the Wehrmachtbefehlshaber or territorial military commander of the Reichskommissariat Ostland, Braemer had (pre­su­ma­bly) an immediate su­pe­ri­or in the person of Reichskommissar (and Gauleiter) Hinrich Lohse, the overall governor of the Ostland who was likewise headquartered in Riga, Latvia.  While Lohse's slapping of Braemer on the face  in public  at the Riga Opera House during the banquet celebrating Hitler's birthday on 20 April 1944 prob­a­bly should not be made too much of, it is indicative nonetheless of the tensions simmering within the Nazi leadership in the Ostland and points at least to the pos­si­bil­i­ty that even to high-ranking (but non­-Wehrmacht and non­-SS) Nazis like Lohse the methods used by Braemer in the implementation of the Holocaust might have seem­ed ob­jec­tion­a­ble (if only on eco­nom­ic grounds, by depriving his administration of needed workforce), even if the event has also been put down to the incipient panic in the face of looming defeat or to personal rivalries be­tween two Nazi apparatchiks vying for a position of pre­-em­i­nence within the Ostland bu­reauc­ra­cy. In some reports the punch from Lohse (meted out in response to Braemer's applying to Lohse the unparliamentary epithet of dummes Luder  "silly rotter") is said literally to have knocked Braemer to the ground. But the knockout blow appears to have been invested with figurative significance as well, as the in­ci­dent marks Braemer's exit from the scene in Riga (on orders from the Wehr­macht which removed him that very day not only from the commandership of the Ost­land but from active duty altogether) and, con­verse­ly, his pro­mo­tion by the SS to the afore­men­tioned higher rank of grup­pen­füh­rer on the same day. Braemer was 61-years' old at the time.

The end game 
After his retirement on 20 April 1944 from the position of Wehrmachtbefehlshaber in the Ostland  an office to which Braemer was first appointed on 24 June 1941 but which from 30 January 1942 onwards he had been holding concurrently with his (second) SS posting on the command of Ober­abschnitt Nord­see, an SS beat headquartered at Altona near Hamburg  he continued on active duty in the latter (non-army) post for 6 months and 3 weeks longer, until 9 November 1944, even while being rusticated by the army to the Führerreserve or officers' reserve pool within the German Army High Command (Oberkommando des Heeres) with effect from 20 April 1944.

After nearly nine months in reserve, on 17 January 1945 Braemer was suddenly recalled by the Wehrmacht to active duty as a so-called "general on special assignment" (General zur besonderen Ver­wen­dung) and in that capacity posted to the Military District Command I at Königs­berg, his native place (Wehr­kreis I (Königs­berg); 1722 January 1945), only to shift after just five days  doubtless in connection with the tightening vice grip by the Soviet forces investing the city  to the Military District Com­mand II at Stettin in Western Pom­er­a­nia (Wehrkreis II (Stettin)), some 480 kilometres (overland) away from Königsberg and its Eastern front, where he spent the following 19 days in a similar capacity (as a "general on special assignment") between 22 January and 10 February 1945. Finally, during the ensuing 22 days between 10 February and 4 March 1945 Braemer exercised (ersatz) "military authority" as a Korück (for definition, see above) or rear-army-area com­mand­er for the Wehrmacht's 11th Army  a largely fictitious formation contrived on paper by Himmler for the sake of providing em­ploy­ment to the rapidly in­creas­ing cadre of unemployed SS functionaries (see 11th SS Panzer Army)  before being relegated once more and for the last time to the Führerreserve of the German Army High Com­mand on 4 March 1945, two months before the end of the War.

Aftermath 
Braemer surrendered to the British Second Army in the port city of Lübeck in Germany on 2 May 1945 and detained as a prisoner of war. Eight months later, on 9 January 1946 he was transferred to the prisoner-of-war camp in South Wales, the so-called Special Camp 11 (Island Farm), where high-value Nazi captives awaiting extradition to Nuremberg were imprisoned. Braemer was interned at Island Farm for 21 months as prisoner No. A451665. On 6 Oc­to­ber 1947, Braemer was transferred from Island Farm  via Camp 43  to the Civil Internment Camp No. 6 at Neuengamme near Hamburg, a post-Nazi concentration-camp facility used after the War specifically for detention of suspected German war criminals. There he was apparently set free some­time later that October without extenuating cir­cum­stances (like ill health: the precise circumstances and date of release are not known), having spent less than  years in prisoner-of-war camps but without having been brought to trial for war crimes. This outcome was ap­par­ent­ly brought about by the deliberate shielding of Braemer by British authorities wilfully refusing to take cognizance of his past as a war criminal.

On 30 August 1948, ten months after his release from British custody, the government of Poland requested the extradition of Braemer on the charge of murder of twenty hostages and hundreds of civilians in Poland in 1939.  By the admission of British Foreign Office personnel, the facts of the case were never in dispute, "not even by Braemer himself". Nevertheless, after legal manoeuvrings and much prevarication intended to shield Braemer from responsibility for his crimes, the ex­tra­di­tion re­quest was refused in September 1950 by the Gov­ern­ment of the United Kingdom. According to some sources, the Polish request for Braemer's extradition was initially presented to (and denied by) the British authorities as early as 1945. In a ruling by the British Extradition Court in Hamburg that has only recently  half a century after the fact  been called into question by some British historians such as Donald Bloxham, Braemer was in effect declared innocent of war crimes on the grounds that the execution ordered by him of the hostages in question "had been so ordered in accordance with the law of nations".

Although Telford Taylor, the legendary American prosecutor at the Nuremberg Trials, takes note of Braemer in several of his books (for example, in The March of Conquest, 1958; see Bibliography), there is no record of Braemer's having ever been called to answer for his role in the Holocaust on the territory of the (former) Soviet Union.

Braemer died of natural causes in Hamburg on 13 June 1955, at the age of 72, a free man who has never been convicted of or charged in open court with any crime.

Braemer's personal papers and personnel files ("Personalakte Walter Braemer"; including pages from his war diary which provide direct evidence of some of his crimes) are preserved at the German Federal Archives-Military Archives (BA­-MA; see Bundesarchiv-Militärarchiv) located at Wiesentalstraße 10 in the city of Freiburg im Breisgau (shelf mark Pers. 6/2102), and at the Bundesarchiv Berlin (BAB).

Awards and decorations
 Iron Cross of 1914, 1st and 2nd class [8]
 Knight's Cross of the Royal House Order of Hohenzollern with Swords [8]
 Military Merit Order, 4th class with Swords (Bavaria) [8]
 Knight's Cross Second Class of the Friedrich Order with Swords [8]
 Knight's Cross, First Class of the Order of the Zähringer Lion with Swords [8]
 Friedrich August Cross, 1st class [8]
 Order of the Iron Crown, 3rd class with war decoration (Austria) [8]
 Military Merit Cross with war decoration (Austria-Hungary) [8]
 Iron Cross of 1939, 1st and 2nd class
 Sword of honour of the Reichsführer-SS
 SS Honour Ring

See also 
Register of SS leaders in general's rank
Niemieckie represje wobec ludności Bydgoszczy (1939) ("German repressions against the population of Bydgoszcz in 1939"  on Polish Wikipedia)
Pacification operations in German-occupied Poland
Operation Tannenberg
Intelligenzaktion Pommern
Valley of Death (Bydgoszcz)
World War II crimes in Poland
Bloody Sunday (1939)
Piotr Szarek
Stanisław Wiórek
Hinrich Lohse (on German Wikipedia)
Reichskommissariat Ostland
The Holocaust in Belarus
Slutsk Affair
Glossary of Nazi Germany

References

Bibliography

Career history 
The Lexikon der Wehrmacht (See online.) (Braemer's military-career timeline in the present article, including dates of appointments and promotions (but excluding military decorations, which have been for the most part omitted altogether as substantively irrelevant), is based primarily on this source, with the sources listed below serving a supplementary role.)
Prisoner information on inmate No. A451665 from the British prisoner-of-war camp  Island Farm  where Braemer was held between 9 January 1946 and 6 October 1947 (See online.)  (In addition to a detailed career timeline, includes dates and places of detention as a POW, and a prison mugshot of Braemer.)
Reichswehrministerium (Heeres-Personalamt) [institutional author], Rangliste des deutschen Reichsheeres: Nach dem Stande vom 1. Mai 1927, Berlin, Verlag von E. S. Mittler & Sohn, 1927, page 56. Google Books
SS-Personalhauptamt [institutional author], Dienstaltersliste der Schutzstaffel der NSDAP... Stand vom 1. Dezember 1938..., ed. B. Meyer, Berlin, [Gedruckt in der Reichs­dru­cke­rei], 1938, page 14. Google Books
SS-Personalhauptamt [institutional author], Dienstaltersliste der Schutzstaffel der NSDAP... Stand vom 20. April 1942..., Berlin, [Gedruckt in der Reichsdruckerei], 1942, page 142. Google Books
Wolf Keilig, Das deutsche Heer, 19391945, vol. 3 (Gliederung; Einsatz, Stellenbesetzung), Bad Nauheim, Verlag Hans-Henning Podzun, 1956, page 43. Google Books
Telford Taylor, The March of Conquest: The German Victories in Western Europe, 1940, New York, Simon & Schuster, 1958, page 411. Google Books
German Order of Battle, 1944: The Regiments, Formations and Units of the German Ground Forces, London, Arms & Armour Press, 1975, pages B-40 & K-9. .
Alexander Dallin, German Rule in Russia, 19411945: A Study of Occupation Policies, 2nd ed., rev., Boulder (Colorado), Westview Press, 1981, page 196. . (1st ed., 1957. For Braemer's spat with Hinrich Lohse. Dallin refers to Braemer as "Friedrich Braemer", with doubtful accuracy, a practice which is repeated in the works of others. However, Walter Braemer is also called "Friedrich Braemer" in: NS-Ge­walt­herr­schaft: Beiträge zur historischen Forschung und juristischen Aufarbeitung, ed. A. Gottwaldt, (Haus der Wannsee-Konferenz: Publikationen der Gedenk- und Bildungsstätte Haus der Wannsee-Konferenz series, vol. 11), Berlin, Edition Hentrich, 2005, p. 226. .)
Otto Bräutigam, "Aus dem Kriegstagebuch des Diplomaten Otto Bräutigam", ed. H. D. Heilmann; in: Götz Aly, Biedermann und Schreibtischtäter: Materialien zur deutschen Täter-Biographie, (Beiträge zur na­ti­o­nal­so­zi­a­lis­tisch­en Gesundheits- und Sozialpolitik series, vol. 4), Berlin, Rotbuch-Verlag, 1987, page 148. , . (For Braemer's spat with Hinrich Lohse.)
Hans-Heinrich Wilhelm, "Motivation und 'Kriegsbild' deutscher Generale und Offiziere im Krieg gegen die Sowjetunion"; in: Erobern und Vernichten: der Krieg gegen die Sowjetunion 19411945, ed. P Jahn, et al., Berlin, Argon Verlag, 1991, pages 173 & 181. . Google Books
Stellenbesetzung der deutschen Heere, 18151939, vol. 3 (Die Stellenbesetzung der aktiven Regimenter, Bataillone und Abteilungen von der Stiftung bzw. Aufstellung bis zum 26. August 1939...), Osnabrück, Biblio-Verlag, 1993, page 477. . Google Books
"Führer-Erlasse" 19391945: Edition sämtlicher überlieferter, nicht im Reichsgesetzblatt abgedruckter, von Hitler während des Zweiten Welt­krieges schriftlich erteilter Direktiven aus den Bereichen Staat, Partei, Wirtschaft, Besatzungspolitik und Mi­li­tär­ver­wal­tung, ed. M. Moll, et al., Stuttgart, Franz Steiner Verlag, 1997, pages 191192, 196197, 204205 & 314315. . (Supplementary information for the dates of Braemer's appointments in the Ostland.)
 Werner Haupt, Army Group North: The Wehrmacht in Russia, 19411945, tr. J. G. Welsh, Atglen (Pennsylvania), Schiffer Publishing, 1997, pages 188, 306, 386. . (Originally published as Heeresgruppe Nord, 19411945, Bad Nauheim, Verlag Hans-Henning Podzun, 1966.)
Die geheimen Tagesberichte der Deutschen Wehrmachtführung im Zweiten Weltkrieg: 19391945, ed. K. Mehner, vol. 8 (1. September 194330. November 1943), Osnabrück, Biblio-Verlag, 1998, page 554. .
  (For Braemer's spat with Hinrich Lohse).

Braemer's war crimes 

Die Verfolgung und Ermordung der europäischen Juden durch das nationalsozialistische Deutschland, 19331945, vol. 7 (Sowjetunion mit annektierten Gebieten; pt. 1, Besetzte sowjetische Gebiete unter deutscher Militärverwaltung, Baltikum und Transnistrien), ed. B. Hoppe, Munich, Oldenbourg Wissenschaftsverlag, 2011, pages 552, 567570, 583, 668 n. 13. .
"Recenzje i omówienia", Wojskowy Przegląd Historyczny (Warsaw), vol. 7, No. 3, JulySeptember 1962, pages 376377, note 78. Google Books
  (First published as 
 B. Asmuss ed.,Deutsche und Polen, 1.9.39: Abgründe und Hoffnungen, et al., Dresden, Sandstein, 2009. .
Franciszek Bernaś and Julitta Mikulska-Bernaś, Najazd, Warsaw, Ludowa Spółdzielnia Wydawnicza, 1964. Google Books (The title translates as "The Invasion".)
Franciszek Bernaś and Julitta Mikulska-Bernaś, Bydgoski wrzesień, Warsaw, Książka i Wiedza (Rada Ochrony Pomników Walki i Męczeństwa), 1968. Google Books ( "The Bydgoszcz September".)
Zygmunt Bielecki and Ryszard Dębowski, In Defence of Independence  Poland, September 1939, tr. S. Tarnowski, Warsaw, Interpress Publishers (Council for the Protection of Struggle and Martyrdom Sites), 1972, page 123. Google Books
Marian Biskup, ed., Historia Bydgoszczy, vol. 2, pt. 2 (19391945), Bydgoszcz, Bydgoskie Towarzystwo Naukowe, 2004. .
Krzysztof Błażejewski, "Oto są oprawcy Bydgoszczy: Pierwszy raz pokazujemy twarze Niemców odpowiedzialnych za egzekucje 9 i 10 września 1939 roku", Express Bydgoski, 9 September 2010. (Article published in a local daily on the 71st anniversary of two of the Bydgoszcz massacres mentioned above.)
Donald Bloxham, Genocide on Trial: War Crimes Trials and the Formation of Holocaust History and Memory, Oxford, Oxford University Press, 2001, pages 199201. . Google Books
 Jochen Böhler, "'Tragische Verstrickung' oder Auftakt zum Vernichtungskrieg? Die Wehrmacht in Polen, 1939"; in: Genesis des Genozids: Polen, 19391941, ed. K.-M. Mallmann & B. Musial, (Forschungsstelle Ludwigs­burg: Veröffentlichungen der Forschungsstelle Ludwigs­burg der Universität Stuttgart series, vol. 3), Darmstadt, WBG: Wissenschaftliche Buchgesellschaft (Auftr. des Deutschen Historischen Instituts Warschau), 2004, pages 3656. , .
 Jochen Böhler, Auftakt zum Vernichtungskrieg: Die Wehrmacht in Polen, 1939, Frankfurt am Main, Fischer-Taschenbuch-Verlag, 2006, pages 206208. , .
Jochen Böhler, Der Überfall: Deutschlands Krieg gegen Polen, Frankfurt am Main, Eichborn, 2009. .
Christopher R. Browning (with contributions by Jürgen Matthäus), The Origins of the Final Solution: The Evolution of Nazi Jewish Policy, September 1939March 1942, Lincoln (Nebraska), University of Nebraska Press; Jerusalem, Yad Vashem, 2004, pages 29, 288290, 303306, 333. , .
Martin Cüppers, Wegbereiter der Shoah: Die Waffen-SS, der Kommandostab Reichsführer-SS und die Judenvernichtung, 19391945, Darmstadt, WBG: Wissenschaftliche Buchgesellschaft, 2005, page 405. .
Wolfgang Curilla, Der Judenmord in Polen und die deutsche Ordnungspolizei, 19391945, Paderborn, Verlag Ferdinand Schöningh, 2011. , .
 
Jürgen Förster, "The Relation between Operation Barbarossa as an Ideological War of Extermination and the Final Solution"; in: The Final Solution: Origins and Implementation, ed. D. Cesarani, London, Routledge, 1994. .
Jürgen Förster, "Wehrmacht, Krieg und Holocaust"; in: Die Wehrmacht: Mythos und Realität, ed. R.-D. Müller & H.-E. Volkmann, Munich, R. Oldenbourg Verlag, 1999, page 959. .
Hans Frank, Okupacja i ruch oporu w Dzienniku Hansa Franka 19391945, vol. 1 (19391942), ed. S. Płoski, et al., tr. D. Dąbrowska, et al., Warsaw, Książka i Wie­dza, 1970, pages 102103. Google Books ( "The [Nazi] Occupation and the Resistance Movement as reflected in the Diary of Hans Frank".)
Ryszard Frelek and Włodzimierz T. Kowalski, Polska: czas burzy i przełomu, 19391945, vol. 1, Warsaw, Wydawnictwa Radia i Telewizji, 1980, page 343. . Google Books ( "Poland in Time of Storm and Transition, 19391945".)
Saul S. Friedman, A History of the Holocaust, London, Vallentine Mitchell, 2004, page 183. ; .
Christian Gerlach, Kalkulierte Morde: Die deutsche Wirtschafts- und Vernichtungspolitik in Weißrußland 1941 bis 1944, Hamburg, Hamburger Edition: Hamburger Institut für Sozialforschung (HIS), 1999, pages 173174, 183, 611614, 619620, 733, 752, 1000, 1014. .
Janusz Gumkowski and Rajmund Kuczma, Zbrodnie hitlerowskie: Bydgoszcz, 1939, Warsaw, Polonia, 1967. Google Books ( "The Nazi Crimes: Bydgoszcz, 1939".)
 
Hannes Heer, "Nicht Planer, aber Vollstrecker: Die Mitwirkung der Wehrmacht beim Holocaust"; in: Genozid in der modernen Geschichte, ed. S. Förster, et al., Münster, Lit, 1999, passim. .
Hannes Heer, Tote Zonen: Die deutsche Wehrmacht an der Ostfront, Hamburg, Hamburger Edition: Hamburger Institut für Sozialforschung (HIS), 1999. . 
Hannes Heer, "Killing Fields: The Wehrmacht and the Holocaust in Belorussia, 1941-42", tr. C. Scherer; in: War of Extermination: the German Military in World War II, 1941-1944, ed. H. Heer & K. Naumann, New York, Berghahn Books, 2000, pp. 55–79. , . (First published as "Killing Fields: Die Wehrmacht und der Holocaust"; in: Vernichtungskrieg: Verbrechen der Wehrmacht 1941 bis 1944, ed. H. Heer & K. Naumann, Hamburg, Hamburger Edition: Hamburger Institut für Sozialforschung (HIS), 1995. .)
 Hannes Heer, "Killing Fields: The Wehrmacht and the Holocaust in Belorussia, 19411942"; in: Holocaust: Critical Concepts in Historical Studies, ed. D. Cesarani, vol. 3 (The "Final Solution"), London, Routledge, 2004, pages 183205. . Google Books
Raul Hilberg, Perpetrators, Victims, Bystanders: The Jewish Catastrophe, 19331945, New York, Aaron Asher Books, 1992, page 62. .
  Google Books.
  Google Books.
  Google Books.
Tadeusz Jaszowski, Hitlerowskie prawo karne na Pomorzu: 19391945, Warsaw, Central Commission for the Investigation of Nazi Crimes in Poland  Instytut Pamięci Narodowej, 1989, pages 40, 47, 95, and passim. Google Books ( "The Nazi Criminal-Code Legislation in Pomerania, 19391945".)
Ryszard Kabaciński, Wojciech Kotowski, Jerzy Wojciak, Bydgoszcz: zarys dziejów, ed. R. Kabaciński, Bydgoszcz, Bydgoskie Towarzystwo Naukowe (Regionalna Pracownia Naukowo-Badawcza), 1980, pages 206ff. Google Books ( "Bydgoszcz in a Historical Outline".)
Kārlis Kangeris, "Latviešu policijas bataljonu izveidošanas otrā fāze  "lielvervēšanas" akcija. 1942.gada februārisseptembris"; in: Okupācijas režīmi Latvijā 1940.1959. gadā: Latvijas Vēsturnieku komisijas 2002.gada pētījumi  Occupation Regimes in Latvia in 19401959: Research of the Commission of the Historians of Latvia (2002), ed. A. Caune, Riga, Latvijas vēstures institūta apgāds, 2004. .
Bastian Keller, Der Ostfeldzug: Die Wehrmacht im Vernichtungskrieg: Planung, Kooperation, Verantwortung, Hamburg, Diplomica-Verlag, 2012, page 83. .
 
Czesław Madajczyk, Die Okkupationspolitik Nazideutschlands in Polen, 19391945, ed. B. Puchert, Berlin, Akademie-Verlag, 1987. . (An author-abbreviated edition of the book originally published in two volumes as Polityka III Rzeszy w okupowanej Polsce, Warsaw, Państwowe Wydawnictwo Naukowe, 1970. Braemer's name is here rendered "Walther Brämer", a common misspelling.)
Klaus-Michael Mallmann, "'... Mißgeburten, die nicht auf diese Welt gehören': Die deutsche Ordnungspolizei in Polen, 19391941"; in: Genesis des Genozids: Polen, 1939-1941, ed. K.-M. Mallmann & B. Musial, (Forschungsstelle Ludwigs­burg: Veröffentlichungen der Forschungsstelle Ludwigs­burg der Universität Stuttgart series, vol. 3), Darmstadt, WBG: Wissenschaftliche Buchgesellschaft (Auftr. des Deutschen Historischen Instituts Warschau), 2004, pp. 71–89. , .
Klaus-Michael Mallmann, Jochen Böhler and Jürgen Matthäus, Einsatzgruppen in Polen: Darstellung und Dokumentation, Darmstadt, WBG: Wissenschaftliche Buchgesellschaft, 2008. . Google Books
 Michael Müller, Canaris: The Life and Death of Hitler's Spymaster, tr. G. Brooks, London, Chatham Publishing, 2007, pages 162163. (First published as Canaris: Hitlers Abwehrchef, Berlin, Propyläen, 2006. .)
 Norbert Müller, Wehrmacht und Okkupation, 19411944: Zur Rolle der Wehrmacht und ihrer Führungsorgane im Okkupationsregime des faschistischen deutschen Imperialismus auf sowjetischem Territorium, Berlin, Deutscher Militärverlag, 1971. Google Books
 Norbert Müller, et al. ed., Die faschistische Okkupationspolitik in den zeitweilig besetzten Gebieten der Sowjetunion: 19411944, (Europa unterm Hakenkreuz series, vol. 5), Berlin, Deutscher Verlag der Wissenschaften, 1991. . Google Books (On Braemer's crimes in the Holocaust in the Ostland.)
 Dieter Pohl, Die Herrschaft der Wehrmacht: Deutsche Militärbesatzung und einheimische Bevölkerung in der Sowjetunion, 19411944, Munich, Oldenbourg Wissenschaftsverlag, 2009, pages 39 & 54. .
Kim C. Priemel, "Sommer 1941: Die Wehrmacht in Litauen"; in: Holocaust in Litauen: Krieg, Judenmorde und Kollaboration im Jahre 1941, ed. V. Bartusevičius, et al., Cologne, Böhlau Verlag, 2003, pp. 3435. .
Edmund Pyszczyński, "'Akcja Tannenberg' w Bydgoszczy w okresie od 5 IX do 20 XI 1939 r."; in: Z okupacyjnych dziejów Bydgoszczy, ed. J. Wiśniowski & J. Sziling, (Bydgoskie Towarzystwo Naukowe: Prace Wydziału Nauk Humanistycznych series E, No. 10), Warsaw, Państwowe Wydawnictwo Naukowe, 1977, pages 5180. Google Books (Essay title  "Operation Tannenberg in Bydgoszcz between 5 September and 20 November 1939"; book title  "From the History of the City of Bydgoszcz under Nazi Occupation".)
Gerald Reitlinger, The House Built on Sand: The Conflicts of German Policy in Russia, 19391945, London, Weidenfeld and Nicolson, 1960, pages 150151, 433. (Reitlinger refers to Braemer as "Friedrich Braemer", apparently following Dallin, German Rule in Russia, 19411945, see above. Dates for Braemer's service in the Ostland given on p. 433 are incorrect.)
Timm C. Richter, "Herrenmensch" und "Bandit": Deutsche Kriegsführung und Besatzungspolitik als Kontext des sowjetischen Partisanenkrieges, 194144, Münster, Lit, 1998, pages 4445. .
Timm C. Richter, "Die Wehrmacht und der Partisanenkrieg in den besetzten Gebieten der So­w­jet­uni­on"; in: Die Wehrmacht: Mythos und Realität, ed. R.-D. Müller & H.-E. Volkmann, Munich, R. Oldenbourg Verlag, 1999, pages 847848. .
 W. Röhr, et al. ed.,Die faschistische Okkupationspolitik in Polen: 19391945, (Nacht über Europa: Die Okkupationspolitik des deutschen Faschismus, 19381945 series, vol. 2), Cologne, Pahl-Rugenstein Verlag, 1989, pages 95, 113114. , .
Alexander B. Rossino, Hitler Strikes Poland: Blitzkrieg, Ideology, and Atrocity, Lawrence (Kansas), University Press of Kansas, 2003. .
 Günter Schubert, Das Unternehmen "Bromberger Blutsonntag": Tod einer Legende, Cologne, Bund-Verlag, 1989, page 76. .
 Andreas Schulz, Günter Wegmann, Die Generale der Waffen-SS und der Polizei, vol. 3 (LammerdingPlesch), Bissendorf, Biblio-Verlag, 2008, page 282. , . Google Books (On the Braemer-ordered massacre of "Swedish Heights".)
Edward Serwański, Dywersja niemiecka i zbrodnie hitlerowskie w Bydgoszczy na tle wydarzeń w dniu 3 IX 1939, 2nd ed., corr. & enl., Poznań, Wydawnictwo Poznańskie, 1984. . Google Books ( "The German Subversives and the Nazi War Crimes in Bydgoszcz in the light of the Events of 3 September 1939".)
 Jan Sziling ed.,Jesień 1939: dokumentacja pierwszych miesięcy okupacji niemieckiej na Pomorzu Gdańskim, Toruń, Toruńskie Towarzystwo Kultury, 1989, pages 7172. Google Books ( "The Autumn of 1939: Doc­u­ments Relating to the First Months of the Nazi Occupation of Pomerelia".)
 
 Michael Wildt, An Uncompromising Generation: The Nazi Leadership of the Reich Security Main Office, tr. T. Lampert, Madison (Wisconsin), University of Wisconsin Press, 2009. . (First published as Generation des Unbedingten: Das Führungskorps des Reichssicherheitshauptamtes, Hamburg, Hamburger Edition, 2002.)
Hans-Heinrich Wilhelm, "Personelle Kontinuitäten in baltischen Angelegenheiten auf deutscher Seite von 1917/19 bis zum Zweiten Weltkrieg"; in: The Baltic in International Relations between the Two World Wars: Symposium organized by the Centre for Baltic Studies, November 1113, 1986, University of Stockholm, Frescati, ed. J. Hiden & A. Loit, Stockholm, Centre for Baltic Studies, University of Stockholm, 1988, pages 157170. . Google Books
Edmund Żurek, Przywróceni życiu, Warsaw, Wydawnictwo MON, 1976. Google Books ( "Those Brought Back to Life".)

External links 
Listing of the generals of the Wehrmacht

1883 births
1955 deaths
Military personnel from Königsberg
People from East Prussia
Nazi Party members
Major generals of the Reichswehr
German Army officers of World War II
Generals of Cavalry (Wehrmacht)
SS-Gruppenführer
Prussian Army personnel
German Army personnel of World War I
People of Reichskommissariat Ostland
Holocaust perpetrators in Belarus
Holocaust perpetrators in Poland
Holocaust perpetrators in Latvia
Recipients of the clasp to the Iron Cross, 1st class
German prisoners of war in World War II held by the United Kingdom